Alfred Thomas Highmore (born 14 February 1992) is an English actor. He is known for his starring roles beginning as a child, in the films Finding Neverland (2004), Charlie and the Chocolate Factory (2005), August Rush (2007), and The Spiderwick Chronicles (2008). He won two consecutive Critics' Choice Movie Awards for Best Young Performer.

Highmore starred as Norman Bates in the drama-thriller series Bates Motel (2013–2017), for which he was nominated three times for the Critics' Choice Television Award for Best Actor in a Drama Series and won a People's Choice Award. In 2017, Highmore began producing and starring as Dr. Shaun Murphy in the ABC drama series The Good Doctor, for which he was nominated for the Golden Globe Award for Best Actor.

Early life
Highmore was born on 14 February 1992 in Camden Town, London. His mother, Sue Latimer, is a talent agent whose clients include actors Daniel Radcliffe and Imelda Staunton. His father is the former actor Edward Highmore, and he has a younger brother named Bertie.

His previous home was in Highgate, North London. Highmore was educated at The Brookland Junior and Infant school in Hampstead Garden Suburb near Golders Green in the London Borough of Barnet until the age of 11 and gained a scholarship to attend Highgate School, an independent school in Highgate, London.

In 2008, Highmore scored straight A* grades in English language and English literature, maths, Spanish, French, Latin, geography, biology, chemistry and physics in his GCSEs exam. In 2010, once again, Highmore achieved straight A* grades in maths, further maths, French and Spanish in his A-level exams. 

From 2010 to 2014, Highmore attended Emmanuel College, Cambridge, where he earned a double first in Spanish and Arabic. He also enrolled at the London School of Economics to study finance at summer school during the summer break at Cambridge in 2011. Highmore worked at Gulf Bank in Kuwait as an intern in 2012, and at a law firm in Madrid during his year abroad while filming the first two seasons of Bates Motel, which made him briefly consider becoming a lawyer after graduation.

Career

1999–2004: Early career as a child actor
Highmore began his acting career with small roles on television at the age of 7. He made his film debut in Coky Giedroyc's comedy Women Talking Dirty (1999), playing the son of a woman who has recently become estranged from her commitment-phobic French lover. In 2001, Highmore played a young King Arthur in the TNT miniseries The Mists of Avalon, a take on the Arthurian legends that depicted the women of Camelot as the real power behind the throne.

In 2001, in the BBC miniseries Happy Birthday Shakespeare, he portrayed a young boy who dreams of moving his family to Stratford-upon-Avon. Highmore has acted alongside members of his family in two separate films: his brother played his brother in Women Talking Dirty, and his father played his father in Hallmark Entertainment's television film Jack and the Beanstalk: The Real Story (2001).

In 2004, Highmore returned to the big screen for the family adventure film Two Brothers, directed by Jean-Jacques Annaud. He played the son of a French administrator who refuses to believe that his new friend, a tiger cub named Sangha, might be dangerous after having tasted blood. He next had a major role in the fantasy film Five Children and It (2004). That same year, Highmore made his breakthrough with a critically acclaimed performance as troubled Peter Llewelyn Davies in Marc Forster's semi-biographical film Finding Neverland. He received several awards and nominations for the role, including a Critics' Choice Movie Award for Best Young Performer, and nominations for the Saturn Award for Best Performance by a Younger Actor and the Screen Actors Guild Award for Outstanding Performance by a Male Actor in a Supporting Role.

2005–2011: Young adult roles

In 2005, he portrayed the main role of Charlie Bucket in Tim Burton's musical fantasy film Charlie and the Chocolate Factory, adapted from the book of the same name by Roald Dahl. He was reportedly recommended by co-star Johnny Depp, with whom Highmore had worked in Finding Neverland; Depp had been impressed by the young actor's performance and thus put his name forward for the role. Highmore had not seen the original 1971 version of the film, and decided not to see it until he was done filming so his portrayal of Charlie would not be influenced. For his role, he again won the Critics' Choice Movie Award for Best Young Performer and was awarded the Satellite Award for Outstanding New Talent. Highmore also lent his voice to the film's accompanying video game of the same name.

He next appeared as a young Max Skinner in Ridley Scott's comedy-drama film A Good Year, which was released in the UK on 27 October 2006. Also in 2006, he began portraying protagonist Arthur Montgomery in the live-action/animated fantasy adventure film Arthur and the Invisibles, released on 13 December 2006. Two sequels followed: Arthur and the Revenge of Maltazard (2009) and Arthur 3: The War of the Two Worlds (2010). For the third film and the trilogy's accompanying video game, Highmore provided voice acting. In 2007, he lent his voice to the adventure fantasy film The Golden Compass (2007) and its video game of the same name. He then portrayed the title character in the drama film August Rush (2007). The story follows a musical prodigy as he searches for his birth parents. This film received a wide release on 21 November 2007.

Highmore next starred in the dual role of American twins Simon Grace and Jared Grace in the fantasy adventure film The Spiderwick Chronicles (2008), based on the popular children's stories of the same name by Tony DiTerlizzi and Holly Black. The film also had a video game, The Spiderwick Chronicles, in which Highmore reprised the characters of Simon and Jared in a voice role. That same year, he provided voice acting for the role of Little Jack in the animated film A Fox's Tale (2008). In 2009, Highmore voiced the lead character in the animated film Astro Boy and provided his voice to its accompanying video game, Astro Boy: The Video Game. He then played the main role in Toast, a BBC autobiographical film about chef Nigel Slater, which was aired on 30 December 2010. Also in 2010, he starred as Hally Ballard in the drama film Master Harold...and the Boys, based on the play of the same name by Athol Fugard. The following year, he co-starred in the romantic comedy-drama The Art of Getting By (2011).

2012–present: Acting, screenwriting, and producing

In 2013, Highmore voiced the title character in the animated adventure film Justin and the Knights of Valour. From 2013 to 2017, he portrayed the iconic role of Norman Bates in the A&E drama-thriller series Bates Motel, a prequel to the Alfred Hitchcock film Psycho that restarts the storyline in the present day. He won a People's Choice Award in 2016 for his performance, and has received nominations for the Saturn Award for Best Actor on Television (2013), the Satellite Award for Best Actor – Television Series Drama (2013), and the Critics' Choice Television Award for Best Actor in a Drama Series (2014–2015, and 2017). Highmore ventured into writing and directing during his time working on the series, writing the fourth season episode "Unfaithful" and the fifth season episode "Inseparable", and directing the fifth-season episode "The Body".

In August 2014, it was reported that NBC had purchased a comedy pilot script written and executive produced by Highmore and Bates Motel showrunner Kerry Ehrin. In 2015, he appeared in the Libertines' music video for "You're My Waterloo". In 2016, Highmore starred in Stephen Poliakoff's BBC Two seven-part miniseries Close to the Enemy and Nick Hamm's political comedy-drama film The Journey.

In 2017, Highmore took on the lead role of Dr. Shaun Murphy, an autistic savant, in the ABC drama series The Good Doctor, and was nominated for the Golden Globe Award for Best Actor in a Drama Series for his performance. He serves as an executive producer and director on the show, and wrote the second season episode "Hello".

Highmore has been cast as the voice of the Duke of Cheshire in the animated film adaptation of The Canterville Ghost. He is to play the title character, Baby Face Nelson, in the A&E drama pilot Baby Face, which he co-wrote and will executive produce with Kerry Ehrin. Highmore will also serve as an executive producer on Ehrin's drama pilot Long Distance for NBC.

In August 2018, Highmore formed his Sony-aligned production company, Alfresco Pictures, which aims to develop scripted series for broadcast, cable, streaming services and international co-productions projects "that have a broader point or message behind them,that try and spark conversations that aren’t being had or give a microphone to voices and experiences that haven’t been heard from before.". "I hope 'Alfresco', aside from being a play on my real name, Alfred, speaks more widely to a sense of refreshing, communal openness that is reflective of the stories we gravitate towards at the company," he said. "In wanting to set up 'Alfresco', it came from a natural desire to be involved in a wider way in the industry ... I always had that natural curiosity to do other things. And that, I guess, shifted into not only wanting to develop my own ideas and projects that I was writing or directing or acting in, but also becoming a producer in a wider sense and helping other people tell their stories."

In August 2019, it was reported that Highmore will co-write and serve as an executive producer for Homesick, a dark comedy in development at the WarnerMedia-owned cable net, which will explore mental health, body image, toxic masculinity and what it means to defy “normal” gender expectations.

Personal life
Highmore lives in London and avoids social media. While on Bates Motel, Highmore developed a close friendship with co-star Vera Farmiga and became the godfather of her son.

Apart from English, Highmore is also fluent in Spanish and French, and semi-fluent in Arabic.

In a September 2021 interview on Jimmy Kimmel Live!, Highmore revealed that he had recently married.

Filmography

Film

Television

Video games

Music videos

Awards and nominations

References

External links

 

1992 births
Living people
21st-century English male actors
Alumni of Emmanuel College, Cambridge
British expatriate male actors in the United States
English expatriates in Spain
English expatriates in the United States
English film producers
English male child actors
English male film actors
English male television actors
English male video game actors
English male voice actors
English television producers
Male actors from London
People educated at Highgate School
People from Camden Town
People from Highgate
Method actors